Hendschiken railway station is a railway station in the municipality of Hendschiken, in the Swiss canton of Aargau. It is located at the junction of the standard gauge Brugg–Hendschiken and Rupperswil–Immensee lines of Swiss Federal Railways.

Services
The following services stop at Hendschiken:

 Aargau S-Bahn:

References

External links 
 
 

Railway stations in the canton of Aargau
Swiss Federal Railways stations